The 2016–17 Ligue 1 was the 58th season of top-tier football in Côte d'Ivoire. The season began on 19 November 2016. AS Tanda are the defending champions, having won each of the last two titles.

The league comprises 14 teams, the bottom two of which will be relegated to the 2017-18 Ligue 2.

Teams
A total of 14 teams will contest the league, including 12 sides from the 2015–16 season and two promoted from the 2015–16 Ligue 2, San-Pédro and WAC.
On the other hand, Korhogo and Yopougon were the last two teams of the 2015–16 season and will play in Ligue 2 for the 2016-17 season. AS Tanda are the defending champions from the 2015–16 season.

Stadiums and locations

League table

Positions by round

References

Ligue 1 (Ivory Coast) seasons
Ivory Coast
1